The Association internationale des femmes (AIF; International Association of Women) was a short-lived feminist and pacifist organization based in Geneva that was active between 1868 and 1872. It demanded full equality between men and women. This was too radical for many feminists at the time.

Foundation

The origins of the association may perhaps be traced to the 1854 proposal by the Swedish feminist Fredrika Bremer for a women-only organization dedicated to peace.
The Swiss feminist Marie Goegg-Pouchoulin (1826–99) was active in the International Peace and Freedom League when it was founded in 1867, became a member of its central committee and edited the league's journal Les États-Unis d'Europe.
On 8 March 1868 the journal published Goegg's proposal to create an international association of women in connection with the league.
This became the Association Internationale des Femmes (AIF).

Foundation of the AIF and of Eugénie Niboyet's feminist and pacifist weekly La Paix des Deux Mondes mark the start of identification by women with peace work.
According to the historian Sandi Cooper, Goegg was responding to the growing militarism of Prussia and aimed for, "the re-education of mothers to prevent another generation of boys trained to respect the false idols of national glory through military conquest.

The AIF was the first transnational women's organization. It was concerned with women's suffrage and with secular education.
The association demanded "equality in salary, in instruction, in the family, and in the law".
An AIF membership card issued to Matilde Bajer of Copenhagen in December 1870 states that its goals were, "To work for the moral and intellectual advancement of woman, for the gradual amelioration of her position in society by calling for her human, civil, economic and political rights."

History

The association's position was too extreme for many middle-class women, so the number of members remained relatively small.
The association's activities were disrupted by the 1870 Franco-Prussian War, but it was revived by Goegg at the end of 1870.
The organization received international coverage in pacifist and feminist publications, such as the journal Woman, edited and published in Italy by Alaide Gualberta Beccari.
However, the association failed to develop a strong organizational foundation. 
By 1872 the AIF was viewed with suspicion, since the word "International" was associated with the Paris Commune. Members were also divided over Goegg's leadership.

In June 1872 a communique was issued that called for a meeting at the home of Julie von May von Rued in Bern to organize a new association called Solidarité: Association pour la défense des droits de la femme (Solidarity: Association for the Defense of Women's Rights). 
Signatories included Caroline de Barrau of France, Josephine Butler of England, Christine Lazzati of Milan and the German feminists Rosalie Schönwasser, Marianne Menzzer and Julie Kühne.
Marie Goegg-Pouchoulin was also active in this organization.

References

Sources

Feminist organisations in Switzerland
Women's rights organizations
Former international organizations
Pacifist feminism
Peace organisations based in Switzerland
Organizations established in 1868
Organizations disestablished in 1872
Organisations based in Geneva
1868 establishments in Switzerland
1872 disestablishments